is a Japanese former football player.

Playing career
Hosokawa was born in Kyoto Prefecture on August 3, 1971. After graduating from Aoyama Gakuin University, he joined the local Japan Football League club Kyoto Purple Sanga in 1994. He played often as right or left back and the club was promoted to the J1 League in 1996. However, he did no play as much in 1996 and he retired at the end of the season.

Club statistics

References

External links

Kyotosangadc

1971 births
Living people
Aoyama Gakuin University alumni
Association football people from Kyoto Prefecture
Japanese footballers
J1 League players
Japan Football League (1992–1998) players
Kyoto Sanga FC players
Association football defenders